Derris robusta is a tree species in the genus Derris found in India.

Derrubone is an isoflavone, a type of flavonoid, originally isolated from D. robusta.

References

External links 

Millettieae
Plants described in 1860